Elliott Furniture Company is a historic building located in Des Moines, Iowa, United States.  It was built in 1891 in the Italianate style for Gustav Newlen, who was an undertaker and cabinet maker.  Eight years later the Elliott family acquired the building and combined the two storefronts into a unified façade for the Elliott Anderson Furniture Company.  The building was extensively renovated in 1936 with the installation of large display windows on both floors, undoing the 1899 renovations.  Four years later saw another renovation with the addition of glazed brick and fluted Terra Cotta pilasters.  This gave the building an Art Moderne appearance.  The building was listed on the National Register of Historic Places in 2015.

References

Commercial buildings completed in 1940
Buildings and structures in Des Moines, Iowa
National Register of Historic Places in Des Moines, Iowa
Commercial buildings on the National Register of Historic Places in Iowa
Moderne architecture in Iowa